is a Japanese manga artist. She debuted in 1966 with the short story Dorobō Tenshi.

Since her debut, Yamato steadily created and published a variety of works in the genre of shōjo manga. Among her early time works, Mon Cherie CoCo, 1971, was adapted into an anime television series, and her work, Haikara-san ga Tōru, 1975 to 1977, was very successful, winning the 1st Kodansha Manga Award for shōjo in 1977. It was also made into a musical for the Takarazuka Revue, an anime series (which reached an international audience through TV broadcasts in Italy and France), and a live-action movie. Through these early works, she established her position as one of the most popular manga artists.

Works 
After the success of Haikara-san ga Tōru, she continued to create many manga, including the comedy Aramis '78 (series), Yokohama Monogatari (The Story of Yokohama), and N. Y. Komachi (The Belle of New York). The latter two were historical manga, set during the Meiji period.

The heroines of these stories were active girls who traveled overseas. Yamato's early work Reidii Mitsuko (Lady Mitsuko), 1976, was based on the true story of Mitsuko Aoyama, who was the mother of Richard von Coudenhove-Kalergi.

Similarly, in Yokohama Monogatari, Uno visits California, marries her Japanese lover there and returns to Yokohama, while Mariko visits London to meet her Japanese husband. In N. Y. Komachi tomboy Shino travels to New York and becomes a camerawoman. At the end she settles in America with her husband Danny.

Asaki Yume Mishi 
Yamato's major work is Asaki Yume Mishi. Yamato spent 13 years (1980–93) completing this famous long work, based on Murasaki Shikibu's The Tale of Genji. Yamato studied the historical details of the Heian period. But she made radical changes to the characters and plot, to fit contemporary mores. Yet her work remains one of the best visualizations of the Heian era.

List of works 
 Dorobou Tenshi, (どろぼう天使, Thief Angel) debut short work, 1966
 Mon Cheri CoCo, (モンシェリCoCo) 1971
 Adapted into an anime television series in 1972
 Redii Mitsuko, (レディーミツコ, Lady Mitsuko). 1975–1976
 Haikara-san ga Tōru, (はいからさんが通る, "The Modern Girl Passes By") 1975–1977
 Adapted into an anime television series in 1978-1979 and a live-action movie in 1987
 Killa, (Killa) 1977–1978
 Ten no Hate, Chi no Kagiri, (天の果て地の限り) 1978
 Aramis ’78, (アラミス’78) 1978–1984
 Kigen 2600 nen no Playball, (紀元2600年のプレイボール) 1979–1980
 Gekkou-ju, (月光樹, Moonlight Shining Tree) 1980
 Yokohama Monogatari, (ヨコハマ物語, The Story of Yokohama) 1981–1983
 N. Y. Komachi, (NY小町, The Belle of New York) 1985–1988
 Asaki Yume Mishi, (あさきゆめみし, Asakiyunemishi, based on Murasaki Shikibu's The Tale of Genji) 1980–1993
 Hi-heel Cop, (ハイヒールCOP) 1989–1994
 Tenshi no Kajitsu, (天使の果実, Fruit of the Angel, based on novel by Shizuka Ijuuin) 1993–1994
 Niji no Natascha, (虹のナターシャ, Natascha of Rainbow, based on novel by Mariko Hayashi) 1995–1997
 Nishimuku Samurai, (にしむく士, Samurai facing to the West) 1997
 Baby-sitter Gin!, (ベビーシッター・ギン!) 1997
 Kurenai Niwofu, (紅匂ふ)

Notes

References 
 Waki Yamato manga at Media Arts Database 
 List of Works  fan site, based on ｢大和和紀自選集5｣(Author's Selected Works, Vol.5) Kodansha, (Japanese)
 List of Works  fan site, based on ｢大和和紀自選集5｣(Author's Selected Works, Vol.5) Kodansha, (Japanese)
 Yamato Waki Haikara-san ga Tooru Kodansha (Japanese comic)
 Yamato Waki Lady Mitsuko Kodansha (Japanese comic)
 Yamato Waki Yokohama Monogatari 8 volumes, Kodansha (Japanese comic)
 Yamato Waki N. Y. Komachi 8 volumes, Kodansha (Japanese comic)
 Yamato Waki Asaki Yume Mishi 13 volumes, Kodansha (Japanese comic)
 ｢あさきゆめみし PerfectBook｣宝島社 (Takarajima co.ltd.), 2003/2007 

Women manga artists
1948 births
People from Sapporo
Manga artists from Hokkaido
Winner of Kodansha Manga Award (Shōjo)
Japanese female comics artists
Living people